Wet 'n Wild, Wet'n'Wild,  Wet N Wild (or other variation) appears in the names of a variety of water parks around the world, including:
Wet 'n Wild (brand)
Wet 'n Wild Emerald Pointe, a water park in Greensboro, North Carolina, United States
Wet 'n Wild (Las Vegas), former water park in Winchester, Nevada
Wet 'n Wild Orlando, former water park in Orlando, Florida, United States
Wet 'n Wild São Paulo, a water park in São Paulo, Brazil
 Wet'n'Wild (brand)
Wet'n'Wild Gold Coast, a water park on the Gold Coast, Australia
Wet‘n’Wild Haikou, a water park Haikou, Hainan, China
Wet'n'Wild Hawaii, a water park in Kapolei, Hawaii, United States
Wet'n'Wild Las Vegas, a water park in Summerlin, Nevada, United States
Wet'n'Wild Toronto, a water park in Brampton, Ontario, Canada
Standalone locations
Wet 'n' Wild Waterworld, a water park in Anthony, Texas
Wet N Wild (North Shields), a water park in North Shields, United Kingdom (closed 2013, reopened August 2014, closed 2020)